Manendragarh Legislative Assembly constituency is one of the 90 Legislative Assembly constituencies of Chhattisgarh state in India.

It is part of Koriya district.

Members of the Legislative Assembly

As a constituency of undivided Madhya Pradesh

As a constituency of Chhattisgarh

Election results

2018

See also
 List of constituencies of the Chhattisgarh Legislative Assembly
 Koriya district

References

Koriya district
Assembly constituencies of Chhattisgarh